John Waddy may refer to:

 John Waddy (actor) (1751–1814), Irish actor and theatrical manager
John Waddy (British Army officer) (1920–2020), officer in the Parachute Regiment during the Second World War, who later became Colonel SAS
John Lloyd Waddy (1916–1987), Royal Australian Air Force fighter ace, who later became a Minister of the Crown